Robert de Finingham (died 1460) was an English monk in the Franciscan (Greyfriars) monastery at Norwich, and an author.

He was born at Finningham, Suffolk, and educated at the monastery where he later became a monk. He flourished in the reign of Henry VI. He is said to have been a very learned man, skilled, as Pits expressed it, "in all liberal arts, excelling especially in canon law", and was the author of numerous Latin works. The chief purpose of his writings was to defend the Franciscans against the common accusation that their profession of poverty was hypocritical.

The titles of his known works are as follows: 
 Pro Ordine Minorum
 Pro Dignitate Status Eorum
 Casus Conciliorum Angliæ
 De Casibus Decretorum
 De Casibus Decretalium
 De Extravagantibus
 De Excommunicationibus. Thomas Tanner describes a manuscript of this in John Moore's library, that is now in the Cambridge University Library (E. e. v. 11).

References

Year of birth missing
1460 deaths
People from Mid Suffolk District
15th-century English people
English Christian monks
15th-century Christian monks